The Goodland City Library, at 120 W. 12th St. in Goodland, Kansas was built in 1912 and was used as a library for 60 years.  It was designed with Italian Renaissance Revival architecture by Denver architects Barrensen Brothers.  It was one of 59 Carnegie libraries in Kansas;  it was funded initially by a $10,000 Carnegie grant.

The building now houses the Carnegie Arts Center, which offers art exhibits, workshops, recitals, demonstrations, lectures and concerts.

It was listed on the National Register of Historic Places in 1985.  It was deemed significant for its architecture and its "association with the cultural and educational history of the community."

References

External links 
 Carnegie Arts Center - official site

Library buildings completed in 1912
Buildings and structures in Sherman County, Kansas
Carnegie libraries in Kansas
Libraries on the National Register of Historic Places in Kansas
Renaissance Revival architecture in Kansas
Tourist attractions in Sherman County, Kansas
1912 establishments in Kansas
Arts centers in Kansas
National Register of Historic Places in Sherman County, Kansas